Brandon Bogle (born June 18, 1987) is an American professional wrestler who works for All Elite Wrestling (AEW) under the name Brandon Cutler. He is an executive producer of content of AEW where he is also signed as a wrestler.

Professional wrestling career

Early years (2005–2011) 
Cutler was trained by the Young Bucks (Matt and Nick Jackson) and debuted in their Victorville, California-based promotion High Risk Wrestling by the ring name Ronnie Tsunami. He spent most of his early career wrestling in the California-based promotions including Empire Wrestling Federation, Alternative Wrestling Show, SoCal Pro Wrestling, Mach One Pro Wrestling, Vendetta Pro Wrestling, Battleground Pro Wrestling, Pro Wrestling LIVE and Pro Wrestling Guerrilla.  He also made a debut in the Ring Of Honor (ROH). After 2011, Cutler disappeared from the ring for the next seven years.

Return to professional wrestling (2018–present) 
Brandon returned in 2018 on January 21 debuting in Alpha Omega Wrestling (AOW) under the ring name Brandon Cutler. During Alpha Omega Wrestling's Unleashed VII, Cutler competed in a three-way match against Funny Bone and Steven Andrews for the AOW Dragon Class Championship. He resumed his wrestling in the California promotions including Maverick Pro Wrestling, Bar Wrestling, LA Lucha, Alternative Wrestling Show and Championship Wrestling From Hollywood. On September 1, 2018, Brandon participated in the Over Budget Battle Royal at All In but was unsuccessful.

All Elite Wrestling (2019–present) 
In a Being the Elite episode, Brandon's trainers Matt and Nick Jackson offered him contract with All Elite Wrestling, which Brandon signed. Cutler debuted on AEW's inaugural event Double or Nothing where he was a participant of the 21-man Battle Royale. He eliminated Billy Gunn but was eliminated by MJF. Cutler returned on the first episode of AEW Dynamite where he lost his singles debut against MJF by submission. On the October 23 edition of AEW Dark, Brandon returned to the ring where he lost another match against Joey Janela. Following this, Brandon went on a losing streak. Following, he went on a losing streak between October 2019 and November 2020 on AEW Dark, both in single and tag team matches.

On the May 26, 2020, edition of AEW Dark, Cutler began a storyline with Peter Avalon in a "race to the bottom", trying to get their first wins in AEW. The next week, Avalon and Cutler would compete in tag team action, losing to teams such as the Natural Nightmares (Dustin Rhodes and Q. T. Marshall), Jurassic Express (Marko Stunt and Luchasaurus), SoCal Uncensored (Christopher Daniels and Frankie Kazarian), and the Young Bucks. They were a dysfunctional tag team until they shook hands with each other as a sign of respect after losing to the Young Bucks. They made a team called the Initiative. However, the Initiative lost all of their matches and couldn't win a single match, leading Peter to attack Brandon Cutler. Shortly after, they resumed their feud against each other with both men fighting to achieve their first victory in AEW. On the September 15, 2020, edition of AEW Dark, Avalon and Cutler had their first match against each other which ended in a double count out, leaving both men still winless. Avalon would face Cutler again on the October 13, 2020, episode of Dark and this time the match ended in a double disqualification, again leaving both competitors without a single victory. On the October 19, 2020, episode of Being the Elite (where much of Avalon and Cutler's feud has played out) AEW President Tony Khan announced Avalon vs. Cutler III for the October 27, 2020, edition of Dark and stipulated that there must be a winner. On the October 27, 2020, episode of Dark, Brandon defeated Peter Avalon and broke his losing streak. After breaking the losing streak, Brandon went on a winning streak. His eight match winning streak came to an end when he lost to Luchasaurus in the January 19, 2021, edition of AEW Dark. Brandon earned his first AEW title shot for the FTW Championship against Brian Cage in a losing effort in the March 11, 2021, edition of AEW Dark. He also appeared twice in AEW Dynamite matches in early 2021, both in a losing effort against Jake Hager and a trios match against Lucha Brothers and Laredo Kid.

Following the Young Bucks' heel turn, Cutler now acts as associate stooge as a member of the Elite often interfering in matches to aid the faction to win the match. Upon doing so, he also changed his attire to a tracksuit in the ring.

Other media 
Cutler has a gaming channel where he usually uploads Among Us and DnD Critical Botch videos.

Early and personal life 
Brandon Bogle was born in California on June 18, 1987. His brother Dustin Bogle, better known by ring name Dustin Cutler, is a retired professional wrestler. They both were also a professional wrestling tag team known as the Cutler Bros and Tsunamis.

Brandon Cutler is married and has two sons.

Championships and accomplishments 
 Alternative Wrestling Show
 AWS Tag Team Championship (1 time) – with Dustin Cutler
 Insane Wrestling League
 IWL Tag Team Championship (1 time) – with Dustin Cutler

References

1987 births
Living people
American male professional wrestlers
Professional wrestlers from California
All Elite Wrestling personnel
21st-century professional wrestlers